Château de Virieu may refer to:

 Château de Virieu (Isère)
 Château de Virieu (Loire)